Animosity was an American death metal band from San Francisco, California, formed in 2000. The band released three studio albums, toured in the United States and Europe, and disbanded in 2009. The classic lineup of Animosity consisted of vocalist Leo Miller, guitarists Frank Costa and Chase Fraser, bassist Evan Brewer and drummer Navene Koperweis.

History
Animosity formed in 2000 in San Francisco, California. They released their debut album, Shut It Down, on Tribunal Records in 2003, when the members of the band were 16 and 17 years old. In 2005, they released their second disc, Empires, on Black Market Activities (with distribution through Metal Blade Records) and toured the United States with Origin and Malevolent Creation. Their third album, Animal, was produced by Kurt Ballou of Converge and released in October 2007. They have also toured Europe with Converge and Belgian hardcore/punk band Rise and Fall. Animosity disbanded officially after nearly a year of non-activity in October 2009. The band's frontman Leo Miller stated that their "musical and experiential goals have been exceeded" and: "If you haven't gotten enough of Animosity, please rest assured that we have."

Musical style
According to Blabbermouth.net, on their debut album, Shut It Down, Animosity "mixed a death metal based sound with thrash and hardcore, (...) incorporating the brutal aspects of [these] styles with accomplished musicianship and little concern for mass appeal", while their following album, Empires, went into an even more death metal-oriented direction.

Members

Final lineup
 Chase Fraser – guitar (2000–2009) (now in Conflux, Continuum, Scour, ex-Decrepit Birth, ex-Son of Aurelius, ex-The Taste of Blood)
 Leo Miller – vocals (2000–2009) (ex-Drumcorps)
 Frank Costa – lead and rhythm guitar (2000–2009) (now in Realms of Vision, ex-Entheos)
 Navene Koperweis – drums (2003–2009) (now in Entheos, Fleshwrought, ex-The Faceless, ex-Animals as Leaders)
 Evan Brewer – bass (2006–2009) (Fallujah, ex-Entheos, ex-The Faceless, ex-Lillake, ex-Reflux)

Former members
 Lucas Tsubota – drums (2000–2003)
 Nick Lazaro – bass, guitar (2000–2004)
 Sean Koperweis – bass (2002–2004)
 Dan Kenny – bass (2004–2006) (now in Suicide Silence, ex-Carnivorous, ex-Light This City)

Timeline

Discography
Studio albums
 Shut It Down (2003)
 Empires (2005)
 Animal (2007)

Other
 Hellraiser Demo (2001)
 Altered Beast (2008, Aaron Spectre remixes)

References

External links
Animosity Video Interview on Metal Injection TV

Musical groups established in 2000
Musical groups disestablished in 2009
Musical groups from San Francisco
American deathcore musical groups
American grindcore musical groups
Death metal musical groups from California
Deathgrind musical groups
Black Market Activities artists
Musical quintets